Flight 615 may refer to:

United Airlines Flight 615, crashed on 24 August 1951
Lufthansa Flight 615, hijacked on 29 October 1972

0615